Constellation Place is a 35-story,  skyscraper in Los Angeles, California, located in the community of Century City. It houses the headquarters of Houlihan Lokey, ICM Partners, Knight Law Group, and International Lease Finance Corporation (ILFC). The tower was built to house the corporate headquarters of Metro-Goldwyn-Mayer (MGM), but after its bankruptcy, MGM moved to Beverly Hills, California in 2011.

History

Constellation Place was constructed from 2001 to 2003. It is the 26th-tallest building in Los Angeles, and the fifth-tallest in Century City. It was the first high-rise to be completed in the 21st century in Los Angeles. The building was designed by Johnson Fain Partners, and has  of Class A office space.

In 2000, Metro-Goldwyn-Mayer (MGM) announced that it was moving its headquarters to a newly constructed building in Century City. Halfway through the design building process, MGM agreed to be the lead tenant. The building opened in 2003 as the MGM Tower.

Alex Yemenidjian, a former chairperson and chief executive of MGM, devised the headquarters space. Roger Vincent and Claudia Eller of the Los Angeles Times said that "Yemenidjian spared no expense in building out the studio's space with such Las Vegas-style flourishes as towering marble pillars and a grand spiral staircase lined with a wall of awards."

Scott Johnson, the architect, designed the bottom third of the tower to have extra-large floors so MGM executives could have outdoor decks. The marble used in the MGM spaces was imported from Italy. MGM received a dedicated private garage, a dedicated security checkpoint, and a dedicated elevator bank. That way, celebrities who visited the complex could enter and exit the building without entering public spaces. Three screening rooms were placed in the tower. One of them was a 100-seat theater on the ground floor. As of December 2010 ICM Partners controls the theater. The 14th floor lobby housed the executive suites and a wall of Oscar statuettes for Academy Award-winning films. The street that leads to the building's garage was renamed MGM Drive. A large MGM logo was placed at the top of the building. In December 2010 MGM rented  of space in the MGM Tower, and it paid nearly $5 per square foot per month in rent.

In 2010, as MGM emerged from bankruptcy protection, it announced that it would move its headquarters to neighboring Beverly Hills to save money. The lease in Century City was scheduled to expire in 2018. Vincent and Eller said that MGM's per square foot monthly rent would be far lower in the Beverly Hills building than in the MGM Tower. Larry Kozmont, a real estate consultant not involved in the move, said "It's a prudent move for them. Downsizing and relocating to a space that is still prominent but not overly ostentatious and burdened by expenses is fundamental for their survival." MGM moved out on August 19, 2011,

Facilities
ICM Partners has its headquarters on the five recently renovated top floors of the building.

As of 2012 it was noted as the first high-rise in Los Angeles to use electricity-generating fuel cells, called  Bloom Energy Servers, as a source of power. The cells, which rely on hydrocarbons such as natural gas to generate power, may produce up to 400 kilowatts of power, which would supply one third of the electricity used to power the building.

Tenants
 Houlihan Lokey headquarters – 4th, 5th, 6th Floors
 ICM Partners corporate headquarters
 International Lease Finance Corporation (ILFC) corporate headquarters - Suite 3400
 Fortress Investment Group – 16th floor
 Latham & Watkins
 Knight Law Group, LLP - Suites 2400 & 2500
 Macquarie Group – Suite 2250
 Ropes & Gray LLP
 Wilmington Trust - Suite 2800
 WeWork

See also

List of tallest buildings in Los Angeles

References

External links

Skyscraper office buildings in Los Angeles
Commercial buildings completed in 2003
Financial services company headquarters in the United States
Century City, Los Angeles